Sayed Elshabrawi (born April 28, 1994 in Cairo) is an Egyptian football (soccer) midfielder.

On 26 December 2013, Sayed made his debut with Al-Ahly in 2013–14 Egyptian Premier League match against El-Entag El-Harby. He came off the bench in the second half.

References

External links
Sayed Elshabrawi - Player Profile

1994 births
Egyptian footballers
Living people
Association football fullbacks
Al Ahly SC players
Al Ittihad Alexandria Club players